Marlinstown is a townland in the civil parish of Mullingar in County Westmeath, Ireland.

The townland is located to the east of Mullingar town, and to the north of Ballinea. A section of the Royal Canal and the N4 road pass through the townland.

References 

Townlands of County Westmeath